Anopheles daciae is a species of mosquito that belongs to the same species complex as Anopheles messeae, from which it can only be distinguished by DNA analysis.

Distribution 
The species was first described from Romania, but has since been found in Croatia, Finland, Germany, Great Britain, Poland, Russia, Serbia, and Sweden.

Taxonomic placement 
Ever since it was described, An. daciae was the subject of scientific debate about its existence due to the very small differences between An. daciae and An. messeae. While results from Romania and Great Britain supported the two-species hypothesis, studies from Italy and Russia disputed this. Two studies from Russia and Sweden, which analyzed the DNA with more advanced methods, could finally determine that An. daciae is indeed a species on its own.

References

daciae
Insects described in 2004